Raoul Nehme (born 1956) served as the Lebanese minister of economy and trade from 2020 to 2021.

Life 
Nehme went to school at Collège Notre Dame de Jamhour and studied in France at the Ecole Polytechnique (engineering with a major in economics) and Mines ParisTech (engineering with a major in scientific management). He is a part of the Greek-Catholic community.

Career 
In January 2020, Nehme was appointed minister of economy and trade by Prime Minister Hassan Diab. He joined the government as President's nominee, though he is himself independent.

Prior to his appointment in the government, Nehme worked in the banking industry. He has experience handling several establishments in crisis:
 BLC bank (Lebanon) board member (2008–2015) and general manager (2010-2015), after it was put in receivership by the BDL due to mismanagement
 T-bank (Turkey) chairman of the board, brought in after the latter was severely affected by the economic crisis.
 AstroBank (Cyprus) chairman of the executive committee (2017–present). He was also a board member on USB bank, a predecessor entity to AstroBank.
 Bankmed (Lebanon) executive general manager (June 2018 – Jan 2020).

Nehme is the president and co-founder of NGO Jouzour Lebanon (meaning "roots of Lebanon"), an environmental NGO dedicated to reforestation.

Minister of Economy 
Nehme's nomination as minister of economy came as Lebanon was experiencing a double political and economic crisis that resulted in a  default on March 9, 2020. The general situation was further complicated by the coincident COVID-19 pandemic. As minister of economy, Nehme introduced measures to protect the consumer by limiting abusive price increases, banning exportation of critical medical equipment and implementing measures to mitigate the propagating of the SARS-CoV-2.

References

External links 
 Bank Med Nomination
 Jouzour Loubnan (roots of Lebanon)
 Lebanon's new government

Economy and Trade ministers of Lebanon
Lebanese Melkite Greek Catholics
École Polytechnique alumni
Mines Paris - PSL alumni
1956 births
Living people
Free Patriotic Movement politicians